The Roman chair is a piece of exercise equipment. The equipment is mainly used for the lower back, but can also target the gluteal muscles, hamstring, and abdominal. The definition of the equipment, and what 'Roman chair exercise' specifically means, is not clear.

Exercises
Various exercises have been called "Roman chair." The most common or earliest historical meaning of the movement is not clear. Bodyweight can provide significant resistance in all variations, and additional weight can be added to increase difficulty. Mainly two actions are followed while exercising with a "Roman chair"—Inhale and Exhale. Inhale is to bend forward from the hips, lowering the chest towards the floor, while keeping the lower neck straight. Exhale is to straighten the body to return to the start position to complete one repetition.

Spinal extension
One type of exercise done on a Roman chair is a type of lower-back hyperextension performed to strengthen the lower back, especially the erector spinae.  The chair holds a person in place, lying prone, as he or she bends at the waist and then extends the body upward.

The exercise is characterized by the two right angles formed by the body, one at the hips and one at the knees. The person enters into the 'chair', with the pad supporting the front of the upper thighs and locking the lower leg (typically at the ankle or heel), bending forward at the waist.  As you bend forward, your upper body will become closer to the ground.  When you have bent as far as comfortable, use the muscles of your lower back to straighten your body, extending your upper body upwards.  Many people at this point extend to the point of hyperextension and curve their backs beyond typical straightness. Great care must be used during this exercise as the lower back can easily be injured. That is the reason why people are advised to extend their backs only up to the point, where their whole body from legs to head is in a straight line.

Spinal flexion
The Roman chair is also used to perform exercises for the abdomen. An exerciser lies supine with their hips supported on the rear (weight on the gluteus maximus) as they bent backward and lift themselves up with their rectus abdominis while stabilizing the pelvis with the hip flexors. If the pelvis moves during the exercise then the hip flexors will also be dynamic prime movers.

A common exercise utilizing the roman chair for targeting the abdominal muscle is the "Roman chair sit-ups". It is an old-school exercise known to strengthen the abdominal muscles. It can also strengthen some secondary stabilizer muscles in the core.

Knee extension
An exercise more commonly referred to as the wall sit, an isometric movement to build strength in the quadriceps, may also be called the Roman chair. It involves a person with their back against the wall, pushing into it using the action of knee extension. Even though it is called a "sit", the hips are actually not being held up by sitting on something. Rather, the body is held up via a combination of weight bearing on the feet and friction created with the wall by exerting pressure against it.

Another exercise called the "Roman chair squat" requires using the quadriceps dynamically. It similarly mimics a sitting motion without actually sitting down on something, and can be done on an apparatus similar to the aforementioned spinal exercises. This is similar to a "sissy squat".

References

Bodyweight exercises
Exercise equipment